ICSA Women's Singlehanded National Championship is one of the seven Inter-Collegiate Sailing Association National Championships. 

This championship was first held in the fall of 1994 (1994-95 season), and the winner is awarded the Janet Lutz Trophy.

Champions

References

External links 
JANET LUTZ TROPHY

ICSA championships
Women's sailing competitions